This is a list of museums in the Republic of the Congo.

Museums in the Republic of the Congo 
 National Museum of the Congo
 Pointe-Noire Museum
 Kinkala Museum

See also 
 List of museums

External links 
 Congo, Republic of the (ROC) - Libraries and museums

 
Congo, Republic of the
Museums
Museums
Museums
Congo, Republic of the